William Stephenson (senior) (1763–1836) was a Geordie (from Gateshead) watchmaker, schoolteacher, poet and songwriter, and father of William Stephenson (junior). His best known works are probably "The Quayside Shaver" and "The Skipper’s Wedding"

Early life 
William Stephenson (senior) was born in Gateshead on 28 June 1763 and was one of the earliest of the Tyneside songwriters.

He became an apprentice with James Atkinson, clock and watchmaker, of Gateshead and continued working there afterwards until a severe accident disabled him. After a long time out of work, and a lengthy spell in the country to recuperate, he decided to change his trade. Being an educated man and something of a literary scholar, he opened a school on the Church Stairs, Gateshead and became a schoolmaster. In this he had great success and continued for the greater part of his life.

William Stephenson died in Gateshead on 12 August 1836, aged 73.

Works 
These include :
 "Quayside Shaver" in Bell's volume, 1812
 The Invitation - later to become The Skipper's Wedding
 Age of Eighty
 The Itinerant Confectioner
 Newcastle on Saturday Night - A Picture of Saturday Night One Hundred Years Ago (that comment written c1890)
 The Retrospect

In 1832 he collected his poems and songs (only 6 songs altogether), and published in a thin octavo volume of 112 pages, dedicated, (by permission), to the Rev. John Collinson, the then rector of Gateshead. The principal poem is entitled "The Retrospect" and introduces and deals with the eccentric and well known characters of Gateshead, as he knew it in his youth. This poem takes up almost one third of the book.

See also 
Geordie dialect words
Thomas Allan
Allan's Illustrated Edition of Tyneside Songs and Readings
John Bell
Rhymes of Northern Bards
P. France & Co.
France's Songs of the Bards of the Tyne - 1850
John Marshall
Marshall's Collection of Songs, Comic, Satirical 1827
W & T Fordyce
The Tyne Songster
John Ross
The Songs of the Tyne by Ross
William R Walker (publisher)
The Songs of the Tyne by Walker

References

External links
 Bards of Newcastle
 Wor Geordie songwriters
 Allan’s Illustrated Edition of Tyneside songs and readings
 John Bell’s Rhymes of Northern Bards
 France's Songs of the Bards of the Tyne – 1850
 Marshall's Collection of Songs, Comic, Satirical 1827
 The Tyne Songster by W & T Fordyce – 1840
 FARNE - Folk Archive Resource North East Songs of the Tyne by Ross
 FARNE - Folk Archive Resource North East Songs of the Tyne by Walker

English singers
English male poets
English songwriters
People from Gateshead
Musicians from Tyne and Wear
Writers from Tyne and Wear
1836 deaths
1763 births
Geordie songwriters